

H
 HABX - Habco International, Inc.
 HALX - Holland American Line - Westours, Inc.
 HAMU - Costa Line
 HANU - Hansa Line
 HANX - L. Hansen's Forwarding
 HAPX - Helm-Atlantic Leasing, LLP
 HARX - GE Rail Services Corporation
 HATU - H A T Enterprises, Inc.
 HATX - Helm Financial Corporation
 HATZ - H A T Enterprises, Inc.
 HB   - Hampton and Branchville Railroad
 HBGX - Hillsboro Bottled Gas Company, HBG Enterprises of Tampa, Inc.
 HBL  - Harbor Belt Line
 HBRY - Hudson Bay Railway (OmniTRAX)
 HBT  - Houston Belt and Terminal Railway
 HBWX - Georgia Power Company
 HCBX - Chevron Phillips Chemical Company
 HCCX - Hercules Cement Company
 HCDU - ER Nahrungsmittel GmBH and Company KG
 HCGX - North American Salt Company
 HCIU - Steam Packet Yard
 HCLX - HIMONT Canada, Inc., Basell Canada, Inc.
 HCMX - Harnischfeger Corporation
 HCPX - Occidental Chemical Corporation (Hooker Industrial and Specialty Chemicals)
 HCRC - Hillsdale County Railway
 HCRR - Honey Creek Railroad
 HCRY - Huron Central Railway
 HCSX - Helm Chesapeake, LLP
 HCTX - Hallett Construction Company, Martin Marietta Corporation
 HCYR  - Horry County Railway
 HDM  - Hudson and Manhattan
 HDMU - Hyundai Merchant Marine (America), Inc.
 HDMZ - Hyundai Merchant Marine (America), Inc.
 HDSX - RailAmerica Equipment Corporation
 HE   - Hollis and Eastern Railroad
 HECX - Hoosier Energy REC, Inc.
 HELX - Helm Financial Corporation
 HENU - Provincial Trailer Rentals
 HENZ - Provincial Trailer Rentals
 HEPX - Ontario Hydro, Hydro One
 HEQX - Helm Financial Corporation
 HERX - GE Rail Services Corporation
 HESR - Huron and Eastern Railway
 HESU - Heritage Environmental Services, Inc.
 HESX - Heritage Environmental Services, Inc.
 HESZ - Heritage Environmental Services, Inc.
 HFPX - General American Transportation Corporation
 HGCX - Hillsboro Glass Company
 HGIU - Hub Group
 HGPX - Harrison Gypsum Company
 HHCX - Huntsman LLC
 HHEX - H and H Engineering Construction, Inc.
 HHHX - Public Service Company of Colorado
 HHLX - H and H Locomotive Leasing, Inc.
 HI   - Holton Interurban Railway
 HIIX - Hamburg Industries, TTX Company (Hamburg Division)
 HIMX - Heppner Iron and Metal Company
 HINX - Heritage Inks International Corporation
 HIPX - Reliant Energy HL and P
 HJBX - H.J. Baker and Brothers, Inc.
 HJCU - HANJIN Container Lines, Ltd.
 HJCZ - HANJIN Container Lines, Ltd.
 HJPX - Larsen Farms
 HJVX - Helm Financial Corporation
 HKGU - Hong Kong Islands Line
 HKGX - Haines & Kibblehouse Inc., The H&K Group
 HKIU - Hong Kong Islands Line
 HKPU - Hong Kong Islands Line
 HKTU - Hong Kong Islands Line
 HKUU - Hong Kong Islands Line
 HKZZ - Hong Kong Islands Line
 HLBZ - Hill Brothers Transportation
 HLCU - Hapag-Lloyd, AG
 HLCX - Helm Leasing Company
 HLEX - Huntsman Polymers Corporation
 HLGX - Helm Financial Corporation
 HLLX - Helm Financial Corporation
 HLMX - Helm Financial Corporation
 HLNE - Hillsboro and North Eastern Railway
 HLPX - Houston Lighting and Power Company
 HLSC - Hampton Railway
 HLTX - Amoco Oil Company
 HMAX - Huntsman Petrochemical
 HMCR - Huntsville and Madison County Railroad
 HMCX - HoltraChem Manufacturing Company, LLC
 HMFX - Florida Rock Industries, Inc.
 HMIX - Henkels and McCoy
 HMJX - Helm Financial Corporation
 HMR  - Hoboken Manufacturers
 HMWX - Heckett MultiServ
 HN   - Hutchinson and Northern Railway
 HNPU - Navale Et Commerciale Havraise Penninsulaire
 HOCU - Hoegh Container Lines
 HOCX - Head-On Collision Line
 HOEU - Hoechst Aktiengesellschaft
 HOG  - Heart of Georgia Railroad
 HOGX - Union Pacific Railroad
 HOKX - Hooker Chemical; Occidental Chemical Corporation (Hooker Industrial and Specialty Chemicals)
 HOMX - Home Oil Company, Ltd., PLM International, Inc.
 HONX - Honeymead Products Company (Division of Harvest States Cooperatives)
 HOS  - Hoosier Southern Railroad
 HOSC - Indiana and Eastern Railroad (The Hoosier Connection); Pennsylvania Railroad; Penn Central; Conrail; Norfolk Southern (after Conrail breakup)
 HOTX - Chicago Freight Car Leasing Company
 HOWZ - Flex-Van Leasing
 HOYU - Hoyer GMBH Internationale
 HPAX - Hammermill Paper Company, International Paper
 HPCX - Hercules, Inc.
 HPIX - HIMONT USA, Inc., Besell USA, Inc.
 HPJX - Helm-Pacific Leasing
 HPLX - Exxon Company, Exxon-Mobil Corporation
 HPPX - Huntsman Polypropylene Corporation
 HPTD - High Point, Thomasville and Denton Railroad
 HPTU - Highway Pipeline
 HRCX - Heritage Railcar
 HRDL - Hudson River Day Line
 HRDX - Silver Star Enterprises, Inc.
 HREX - Heavy Railroad Excavations, Inc.
 HRLU - Hudson Railway Equipment Company (Division of Hudson Leasing Company)
 HRLZ - Hudson Railway Equipment Company
 HROX - Lehigh Hanson, Inc. (construction aggregate producer)
 HRRC - Housatonic Railroad
 HRRX - Conrail, On-Track Railcar Services, Inc.
 HRS  - Hollidaysburg and Roaring Spring Railroad
 HRSX - Harbor Rail Services of California, Inc.
 HRT  - Hartwell Railroad
 HS   - Housatonic Southern, Hartford and Slocomb Railroad, H and S Railroad
 HSCX - Steel Wheels, Ltd.
 HSFZ - Atchison, Topeka and Santa Fe Railway
 HSIX - Housing Starts, Inc.
 HSLU - Haulage Services, Ltd.
 HSRR - Hardin Southern Railroad
 HSRZ - H and S Railroad
 HSW  - Helena Southwestern Railroad
 HTCX - Transportation Corporation of America, GE Rail Services Corporation
 HTMU - Hansen and Tidemann, Inc.
 HTSU - High Tech Transport, Ltd.
 HTSX - Herzog Transit Services, Inc.
 HTTX - Trailer Train Company, TTX Corporation
 HTW  - Hoosac Tunnel and Wilmington
 HUBA - Hudson Bay, Burlington Northern and Santa Fe Railway; BNSF Railway
 HUDX - Hudson Technologies, Inc.
 HUKU - Huktra (UK), Ltd.
 HUNX - Huntting Elevator Company
 HUTX - Hutchinson Transportation Company
 HWCX - Halliburton Company
 HWPX - Hiram Walker and Sons, Inc.
 HYDX - Union Carbide Corporation, Praxair, Inc.
 HYWX - Georgia Power Company
 HZGX - Herzog Contracting Corporation

H